David Noonan may refer to:

 David Noonan (artist) (born 1969), London artist
 David Noonan (cricketer) (1876–1929), Australian cricketer
 David Noonan (game designer), designer for the Dungeons & Dragons game
 David Noonan (environmentalist), Australian anti-nuclear activist and climate campaigner
 David Noonan, New Democratic Party candidate at the 2003 Ontario provincial election